The 2014–15 Hong Kong League Cup Final was a football match that took place on 22 April 2015 at Mong Kok Stadium, Hong Kong. It was the final match of the 2014–15 Hong Kong League Cup, a football competition for the teams in the Hong Kong Premier League.

Details

See also
The Hong Kong Football Association
Hong Kong Premier League

References

External links
Official website of Hong Kong League Cup

 
Hong Kong Premier League
Football cup competitions in Hong Kong